Filter theory is a sociological theory concerning dating and mate selection. It proposes that social structure limits the number of eligible candidates for a mate. Most often, this takes place due to homogamy, as people seek to date and marry only those similar to them (characteristics that are often taken into account are age, race, social status and religion). Homogamy is the idea of marriage between spouses who share similar characteristics, where heterogamy denotes marriage between spouses of different characteristics. The idea of "opposites attract” is heterogamous, as well as the idea that one spouse has complementing, not similar characteristics to the other.

Helpful terms in defining filter theory are "endogamy", which indicates that both partners come from the same group (ethnicity, religion, culture, age similarity, lifestyle, etc.) and may also carry cultural sanctions against marrying outside of one's own group, and "exogamy", which indicates marrying out of one's own social group. Examples of exogamy include marrying outside of one's own race or religion.

Psychology perspective 

 Filtering model created by psychologists Louis Janda and Karen Klende-Hamel
 Married Couples → Eligible Partner
 Starting with the base of all people, remove married couples, who are not available to be in a relationship, and Eligible Partners remain; all those who are available to be in a relationship.
 Compatibility Filter →  Eligible Individuals Attracted to Each Other
 The Compatibility Filter removes all people who are not attracted to each other, leaving only those who are compatible
 Physical Attractiveness Filter → Homogamous Potential Partners
 Outside appearance and attraction
 People are more likely to be physically attracted to those who look similar to themselves.  Humans have inherited the innate instinct to survive and reproduce and must do both within the confines of the particular environment where they live, from their animal ancestors. 
 Nevertheless, the importance of physical homogamy in marital relationships is decreasing
 This can be due to interracial marriage
 Similar and Complementary Views Filter
 People are more likely to choose to be with a partner who think very similarly to themselves while straying from people with conflicting ideas and views.
 Potential Field of Partners
 After all filters have been applied, this group of people remains as potential partners.
 People Who Live in Proximity → Total Field of Potential Partners
 Of all the people who are potential partners, for practical reason people choose partners who are close by.
 With growing communications and technological advances, proximity is not limited to being geographically nearby.
 The spreading availability of online dating is increasing the ability to communicate without face-to-face interactions and activities.

Sociological perspective 
 Different cultures have different desired aspects in a partner, but all of these different aspects fall into the same categories.  For example, love-marriage selection criteria seem to reflect individuals' personal concerns, such as personal and interpersonal qualities of the prospective mate and compatibility issues, while arranged-marriage selection criteria, not surprisingly, reflect concerns of the total family unit (Blood 1972). These family concerns include socioeconomic status, health, strength, fertility, temperament, and emotional stability of the prospective spouse. Yet, the similarities in characteristics between the two partners is consistent in both marriages.
 People are drawn to someone with a similar lifestyle and standard of living.  These people have a higher chance of common personal tastes, opinions and values with one another, making it easier to establish affinitive relations. These aspects can be assimilated through the different social networks.  Contrary to popular belief, having a common profession is not the strongest predictor of compatibility; educational homophily trends towards confirming cultural differences and similarities, which are stronger than occupational stratification. In essence, working in proximity with someone in a similar work force does not necessarily lead to a stronger bond than having educational similarities.  Some of this leads back to the similarities between cultures and education; in education there is a separation of the larger peer group into smaller peer groups, of which share common economic status, subject of study, and/or backgrounds. This allows homogamy between these subgroups of peers, and thus creating smaller groups that share two or more similarities.  This example of status and educational culture reflects how people meet in the world through social networks.

Theory of complementary needs
 A study carried out by sociologist Robert F. Winch on twenty five couples for the purpose of testing out the theory of the ways in which complementariness appears to function in mate-selection. The theory is both psychological and sociological because it derives from the Freudian tradition, but also concerns the formation of a social group; the marital dyad. The theory states that individuals choose partners based on their needs being complementary to oneself. It begins with the observation that, in the United States, a couple is first formed by the meeting and acquainting of one another, and then by falling in love before deciding to marry. As a result, Winch proposes that, "since meeting appears to be a precondition for falling in love, what observations can we make about whom one meets or is likely to meet?" Well, he states, it is more common than not that if one frequents certain places, they will most likely find someone who is, "accustomed to the same level of consumption, that they will cherish similar values, and that they will harbor similar aversions and prejudices". In other words, an atheist is unlikely to encounter a habitué of Sunday mass, as a man who frequents the bar is unlikely to encounter a recovering alcoholic. As social psychologist Andrea B. Hollingshead states, "next to race, religion is the most decisive factor in the segregation of males and females into categories that are approved or disapproved with respect to nuptiality".
 Winch found that people tend to associate with and to marry among persons similar to themselves, but that it is also thought to be desirable and right for one to marry "among one's own" in regard to race, religion, etc.. He also argued that there is a set of variables on which homogamy has been shown to function: race, religion, social class, broad occupational grouping, location of residence, income, age, level of education, intelligence, etc. With these variables, he argues, the sort of people with whom one shall most likely interact with are chosen, and in turn, they define a "field of eligible spouse-candidates". These 'spouse-candidates' are not just people within close proximity to us, but rather, people who we pass on a day-to-day basis because of our routine and may have never even noticed. In other words, someone's spouse may end up being the man sitting behind them in church every Sunday, or the woman they are running next to at the gym.

Considerations
 While mate-selection has been found to be mostly homogamous in regard to social characteristics, such as religion, the psycho-dynamic of couples has not been. According to Sigmund Freud, there was a tendency for self-loving people to mate with those who were emotionally dependent, and similarly, one may fall in love with a particular person because they represent a perfection which the other has unsuccessfully striven to attain. This is in relation to Winchs' Theory of Complementary Needs, which says people look for qualities in a partner that will complement their own.
 According to the similarity principle, the more two people perceive themselves to be similar, the more likely their relationship is to grow and succeed. In this, the word “perceive” holds a lot of significance because one may perceive that they are more similar to someone than they actually are, and therefore believe they have more in common than they really do. Additionally, an individual may be inclined to over look differences because importance is held over certain similarities more than others.

References

Dating
Sociological theories